Larysa Zaspa (born September 22, 1971 in Khmelnytskyi, Ukrainian SSR, Soviet Union) is a Ukrainian team handball goalkeeper. She received a bronze medal as captain for the Ukrainian national team at the 2004 Summer Olympics in Athens.

Club player
Zaspa plays for the Ukrainian club HC "Motor" Zaporozhye. She received a bronze medal in the Women's EHF Cup in 2005/2006.

References

Ukrainian female handball players
Handball players at the 2004 Summer Olympics
Olympic bronze medalists for Ukraine
1971 births
Living people
Olympic medalists in handball
Medalists at the 2004 Summer Olympics
Sportspeople from Khmelnytskyi, Ukraine